Tianzhu Area is an area and a town on the southwestern corner of Shunyi District, Beijing, China. It is located at the south of Nanfaxin and Houshayu Towns, west of Renhe and Liqiao Towns, north of Jinzhan and Sunhe Townships, east of Konggang Subdistrict, and surrounds Capital Airport Subdistrict on three sides. It had 32,979 residents according to the 2020 census.

The area's name is a corruption of Tianzhuzhuang, an imperial garden during the Liao dynasty.

History

Administrative divisions 

As of 2021, Tianzhu Area was composed of 11 subdivisions, which can be further classified into 3 communities and 8 villages:

See also 

 List of township-level divisions of Beijing

References 

Shunyi District
Towns in Beijing
Areas of Beijing